Chinese Spring may refer to:
 Chinese Spring Offensive
 Chinese Spring (Wyoming)